The 2007 Trophée Éric Bompard was the fourth event of six in the 2007–08 ISU Grand Prix of Figure Skating, a senior-level international invitational competition series. It was held at the Palais omnisports de Paris-Bercy in Paris on November 15–18. Medals were awarded in the disciplines of men's singles, ladies' singles, pair skating, and ice dancing. Skaters earned points toward qualifying for the 2007–08 Grand Prix Final. The compulsory dance was the Austrian Waltz.

The competition was named after the Éric Bompard company, which became its chief sponsor in 2004.

Results

Men

Ladies

Pairs
Jessica Miller / Ian Moram and Tiffany Vise / Derek Trent were both credited with throw quadruple salchow jumps in the free skating. Vise / Trent's was ratified as the first quadruple salchow jump performed in international competition.

Ice dancing

References

External links
 2007 Trophée Éric Bompard at ISU
 Starting orders and Results
  

Trophée Éric Bompard, 2007
Internationaux de France
Figure
Trophée Éric Bompard
Figure skating in Paris
International figure skating competitions hosted by France
Trophée Éric Bompard